Helena Historic District may refer to:

Helena Historic District (Helena, Alabama), listed on the National Register of Historic Places in Shelby County, Alabama
Helena Historic District (Helena, California), listed on the National Register of Historic Places in Trinity County, California
Helena Historic District (Helena, Montana), listed on the National Register of Historic Places in Lewis and Clark County, Montana
Helena Railroad Depot Historic District, Helena, Montana, listed on the National Register of Historic Places in Lewis and Clark County, Montana
Helena West Main Street Historic District, Helena, Montana, listed on the National Register of Historic Places in Lewis and Clark County, Montana
Mount Helena Historic District, Helena, Montana, listed on the National Register of Historic Places in Lewis and Clark County, Montana

See also
St. Helena Historic Commercial District, St. Helena, California, listed on the National Register of Historic Places in Napa County, California